This article lists female chess players who have received official World Chess Federation (FIDE) titles or are otherwise renowned as women in chess.

Grandmasters

There are 40 female players who have been awarded the title of Grandmaster,  the highest lifetime title in chess, all of whom are living as of September 2022.

International Masters
As of March 2022, there are 134 women who hold the International Master title, all but seven of whom are living. (Deceased players noted by † symbol.)

  Olga Alexandrova
  Bibisara Assaubayeva
  Silvia Alexieva
  Karina Ambartsumova
  Meri Arabidze
  Ekaterina Atalik
  Medina Warda Aulia
  Olga Badelka
  Batchimeg Tuvshintugs
  Irina Berezina
  Alina Bivol
  Anastasia Bodnaruk
  Nataša Bojković
  Angela Borsuk
  Marina Brunello
  Nataliya Buksa
  Irina Bulmaga
  Elisaveta Bykova†
  Daria Charochkina
  Dagnė Čiukšytė
  Karina Cyfka
  Deimantė Daulyte-Cornette
  Yelena Dembo
  Dorsa Derakhshani
  Joanna Dworakowska
  Marsel Efroimski
  Martha Fierro Baquero
  Cristina Foișor†
  Alisa Galliamova
  Lilit Galojan
  Inna Gaponenko
  Anita Gara
  Marta García Martín
  Rusudan Goletiani
  Pauline Guichard
  Guo Qi
  Sopiko Guramishvili
  Nino Gurieli
  Marina Guseva
  Sopio Gvetadze
  Zuzana Hagarová
  Jovanka Houska
  Harriet Hunt
  Nana Ioseliani
  Jana Jacková
  Lela Javakhishvili
  Ketino Kachiani-Gersinska
  Eesha Karavade
  Alina Kashlinskaya
  Sarasadat Khademalsharieh
  Sopiko Khukhashvili
  Nino Khurtsidze†
  Masha Klinova
  Tatiana Kononenko
  Ekaterina Korbut
  Liubov Kostiukova
  Ekaterina Kovalevskaya
  Kulkarni Bhakti
  Klaudia Kulon
  Alina l'Ami
  Susan K. Lalic
  Tea Lanchava
  Li Ruofan
  Maia Lomineishvili
  Carolina Luján
  Ildikó Mádl
  Aleksandra Maltsevskaya
  Gulnar Mammadova
  Gunay Mammadzada
  Alisa Marić
  Iulia Mashinskaya
  Ana Matnadze
  Svetlana Matveeva
  Nóra Medvegy
  Salome Melia
  Sophie Milliet
  Lilit Mkrtchian
  Nisha Mohota
  Eva Moser†
  Batkhuyag Munguntuul
  Guliskhan Nakhbayeva
  Nomin-Erdene Davaademberel
  Lisandra Teresa Ordaz Valdés
  Iulija Osmak
  Evgenija Ovod
  Nazí Paikidze
  Corina Peptan
  Svetlana Petrenko
  Phạm Lê Thảo Nguyên
  Sofia Polgar
  Maka Purtseladze
  Iweta Rajlich
  Olita Rause
  Eva Repková
  Paula Andrea Rodriguez Rueda
  Padmini Rout
  Olga Rubtsova†
  Lyudmila Rudenko†
  Anna Rudolf
  Tania Sachdev
  Dinara Saduakassova
  Nurgyul Salimova
  Sarai Sanchez Castillo
  Anna Sargsyan
  Anastasia Savina
  Zoya Schleining
  Elena Sedina
  Shen Yang
  Polina Shuvalova
  Yuliya Shvayger
  Almira Skripchenko
  Soumya Swaminathan
  Irene Kharisma Sukandar
  Elena Tairova†
  Stavroula Tsolakidou
  Irina Turova
  Laura Unuk
  Vaishali Rameshbabu
  Szidonia Vajda
  Irina Vasilevich
  Tatjana Vasilevich
  Sabrina Vega Gutiérrez
  Iva Videnova
  Subbaraman Vijayalakshmi
  Annie Wang
  Wang Yu
  Carissa Yip
  Elena Zaiatz
  Anna Zatonskih
  Nastassia Ziaziulkina
  Olga Zimina
  Anna Zozulia

Alphabetical list
This list of female chess players includes people who are primarily known as chess players and have an article on the English Wikipedia. It includes the preceding lists of Grandmasters and International Masters.

A
 Abdumalik, Zhansaya (2000) Kazakhstan – GM
 Afonasieva, Anna (2001) Russia – WIM
 Aginian, Nelly (1981) Armenia – WGM
 Akhsharumova, Anna (1957) Russia, USA – WGM
 Julia Alboredo (1997) Brazil – WIM
 Alekhine, Grace (1876–1956) USA, United Kingdom, France
 Alexandria, Nana (1949) Georgia – WGM
 An Yangfeng (1963) China – WIM
 Andriasian, Siranush (1986) Armenia – WIM
 Arakhamia, Ketevan (1968) Georgia, Scotland – GM
 Assaubayeva, Bibisara (2004) Kazakhstan – IM
 Atalik, Ekaterina (1982) Russia, Turkey – WGM and IM

B
 Bain, Mary (1904–1972) USA – WIM
 Belakovskaia, Anjelina (1969) Ukraine, USA – WGM
 Belavenets, Liudmila (1940) Russia – ICCF Women's World Champion, WIM
 Belenkaya, Dina (1993) Russia – WGM
 Bellin, Jana  (1947) Czech, England – WGM
 Benedict, Clare (1871–1961) USA, Switzerland
 Benini, Clarice (1905–1976) Italy – WIM
 Berend, Elvira (1965) Kazakhstan/Luxembourg – WGM
 Berezina, Irina (1965) Australia – IM
 Beskow, Katarina (1867–1939) Sweden
 Bhakti Kulkarni (1992) India – WGM
 Bijoux, Caroline (1976) South Africa
 Bivol, Alina (1996) Russia – IM
 Borisova, Borislava (1951) Sweden/Bulgaria – WIM
 Botez, Alexandra (1995) Canada – WFM
 Botsari, Anna-Maria (1972) Greece – WGM
 Brustman, Agnieszka (1962) Poland – WGM
 Burtman, Sharon Ellen (1968) USA – WIM
 Bykova, Elisabeth (1913–1989) Russia – Women's World Champion, WGM

C
 Caoili, Arianne (1986–2020) Australia – WIM
 Cardoso, Ruth (1934–2000) Brazil – WIM
 Carrasco, Berna (1914–2013) Chile – WIM
 Chaudé de Silans, Chantal (1919–2004) France – WIM
 Chaves, Joara (1962) Brazil – WIM
 Chaves, Jussara (1959) Brazil – WIM
 Chiburdanidze, Maia (1961) Georgia – Women's World Champion, GM 1984
 Čiukšytė, Dagnė Č (1977) Lithuania, England – WGM and IM
 Çınar Çorlulu, Nilüfer (1962) Turkey – WIM
 Corke, Anya (1990) Hong Kong, England – WGM
 Čmilytė, Viktorija (1983) Lithuania – WGM and IM
 Cramling Bellon, Anna (2002) Sweden – WFM
 Cramling, Pia (1963) Sweden – GM 1992

D
 Dekic, Biljana (1950) Australia – WIM
 Dembo, Yelena (1983) Russia, Israel, Hungary, Greece – WGM and IM
 Ding Yixin (1991) China – WGM
 Donaldson, Elena (1957–2012) Russia, Georgia, USA – WGM
 Drastik, Penelope (1997) Australia
 Dzagnidze, Nana (1987) Georgia – GM 2008

E
 Edzgveradze, Natalia (1975) Georgia – WGM
 Eidelson, Rakhil (1958) Belarus – WGM
 Ereńska, Hanna (1946) Poland – WGM
 Eretová, Květa (1926) Czechoslovakia – WGM

F
 Fagan, Louisa Matilda (1850–1931) Italy, UK
 Miss Fatima India, United Kingdom
 February, Jesse (1997) South Africa – WIM
 Feliciano, Vanessa (1990) Brazil – WIM
 Fierro, Martha (1977) Ecuador – WGM and IM
 Fischdick, Gisela (1955) Germany – WGM
 Fisher, Michelle (1997) South Africa – WFM
 Flear, Christine (1967) France – WIM
 Francisco, Candela (2006) Argentina – WFM
 Forbes, Cathy (1968) England – WIM
 Cristina Adela Foișor (1967–2017) Romania – WGM and IM
 Frick, Denise (1980) South Africa – WIM

G
 Galliamova, Alisa (1972) Russia – WGM and IM
 Gaprindashvili, Nona (1941) Georgia – Women's World Champion, GM 1978
 Gara, Anita (1983) Hungary – WGM and IM
 Gara, Ticia (1984) Hungary – WGM
 Leya Garifullina (2004) Russia – WGM
 Gerlecka, Regina (1913–1983) Poland
 Gilbert, Ellen (1837–1900) USA
 Gilchrist, Mary (c.1882–1947) Scotland
 Girya, Olga (1991) Russia – GM
 Golubenko, Valentina (1990) Estonia, Croatia – WGM
 Javiera Belén Gómez Barrera (2002) Chile – WIM 
 Gong Qianyun (1985) China – WGM
 Goryachkina, Aleksandra (1998) Russia – GM
 Graf, Sonja (1908–1965) Germany, Argentina, USA – WIM
 Greeff, Melissa (1994) South Africa – WGM
 Gresser, Gisela (1906–2000) USA – WIM
 Guggenberger, Ilse (1942) Colombia – WIM
 Gunina, Valentina (1989) Russia – GM 2013
 Guo, Emma (1995) Australia – WIM
 Guo Qi (1995) China – IM
 Guramishvili, Sopiko (1991) Georgia – WGM and IM

H
 Hamid, Rani (1944) Bangladesh – WIM
 Harika, Dronavalli (1991) India – GM
 Harum, Gisela (1903–1995) Austria
 Heemskerk, Fenny (1919–2007) The Netherlands – WGM
 Herman, Róża (1902–1995) Poland – WIM
 Hoang, Thanh Trang (1980) Vietnam, Hungary – GM 2007
 Holloway, Edith (1868–1956) England – WIM
 Hołuj-Radzikowska, Krystyna (1931–2006) Poland – WGM
 Hou Yifan (1994) People's Republic of China – GM 2008
 Houska, Jovanka (1980) England – WGM and IM
 Huang Qian (1986) China – WGM
 Hunt, Harriet (1978) England – WGM and IM

I
 Injac, Teodora (2000) Serbia – WGM
 Ioseliani, Nana (1962) Georgia – WGM and IM

J
 Jacková, Jana (1982) Czech Republic – WGM and IM
 Jackson Sheila (1957) England – WGM
 Johansson, Viktoria (1974) Sweden – WIM
 Ju Wenjun (1991) China – GM

K
 Karavade, Eesha (1987) India – WGM and IM
 Karff, Mona (1914–1998) Bessarabia (Moldova), Palestine, USA – WIM
 Kazarian, Anna-Maja (2000) Netherlands – WIM and FM
 Keller-Herrmann, Edith (1921–2010) Germany – WGM
 Khoudgarian, Natalia (1975) Russia, Canada – WIM
 Khurtsidze, Nino (1975–2018) Georgia – WGM and IM
 Kiołbasa, Oliwia (2000) Poland – WIM
 Kļaviņa, Ilga (1941) Latvia
 Klovāne, Astra (1944) Latvia
 Konarkowska-Sokolov, Henrijeta (1938) Poland, Serbia – WGM
 Koneru, Humpy (1987) India – GM 2002
 Korbut, Ekaterina (1985) Russia –  WGM and IM
 Kosintseva, Nadezhda (1985) Russia –  WGM and IM
 Kosintseva, Tatiana (1986) Russia –  WGM and IM
 Kosteniuk, Alexandra (1984) Russia –  Women's World Champion, GM 2004
 Kostiuk, Tatiana (1982) Ukraine – WGM
 Kozlovskaya, Valentina (1938) Russia – WGM
 Kristol, Ljuba (1944) Russia, Israel – ICCF Women's World Champion
 Krush, Irina (1983) Ukraine, USA – GM (2013)
 Kursova, Maria (1986) Armenia – WGM
 Kushnir, Alla (1941–2013) Russia, Israel – WGM

L
 Lahno, Kateryna (1989) Ukraine, Russia – GM 2007
 Latreche, Sabrina (1993) Algeria – WIM
 Lane, Lisa (1938) USA – WIM
 L'Ami, Alina (1985) Romania – IM
 Larsen, Ingrid (1909–1990) Denmark – WIM
 Lauberte, Milda (1918–2009) Latvia – WIM
 Lazarević, Milunka (1932) Serbia – WGM
 Lei Tingjie (1997) China – GM
 Leite, Catarina(1983) Portugal – WIM
 Levitina, Irina (1954) Russia, USA – WGM
 Li Ruofan (1997) China – IM
 Lin Ye (1974) China – WFM
 Litinskaya-Shul, Marta (1949) Ukraine – WGM
 Liu Shilan (1962) China – WGM
 Lu Xiaosha (1973) China – WIM
 Librelato, Kathiê (1998) Brazil – WIM

M
 Macalda di Scaletta (c. 1240–c. 1310) Kingdom of Sicily
 Mádl, Ildikó (1969) Hungary – WGM and IM
 Majdan, Joanna (1988) Poland – WGM
 Maltsevskaya, Aleksandra (2002) Russia – WGM and IM
 Marić, Alisa (1970) USA, Serbia – WGM and IM
 Marić, Mirjana (1970) Serbia – WGM
 Marinello, Beatriz (1964) Chile – WIM
 Matveeva, Svetlana (1969) Russia – WGM and IM
 Menchik, Olga (1908–1944) Czechoslovakia, England
 Menchik, Vera (1906–1944) Czechoslovakia, England – Women's World Champion
 Meyer, Marany (1984) South Africa/New Zealand – WIM
 Michell, Edith (1872–1951) England
 Milliet, Sophie (1983) France – WGM and IM
 Mišanović, Vesna (1964) Bosnia and Herzegovina – WGM
 Mkrtchian, Lilit (1982) Armenia – WGM and IM
 Mora, María Teresa (1902–1980) Cuba – WIM
 Muminova, Nafisa (1990) Uzbekistan – WGM
 Puteri Munajjah Az-Zahraa Azhar (2001) Malaysia – WIM
 Mutesi, Phiona (1993) Uganda – WCM
 Muzychuk, Anna (1990) Ukraine, Slovenia – WGM and IM

N
 Nakhbayeva, Guliskhan (1991) Kazakhstan – IM
 Nakhimovskaya, Zara (1931) Israel
 Nebolsina, Vera (1989) Russia – WGM
 Ning Chunhong (1968) China – WGM
 Nyberg, Christina (1962) Sweden
 Nandhidhaa, Pallathur Venkatachalam (1996) India - WGM

O
 Omonova, Umida (2006) Uzbekistan – WFM
 Ortiz Verdezoto, Anahí (2001) Ecuador – WIM
 Ovezdurdiyeva, Jemal (1998) Turkmenistan – WFM
 Öztürk, Kübra (1991) Turkey – WGM

P
 Pähtz, Elisabeth (1985) Germany – WGM and GM
 Paridar, Shadi (1986) Iran – WGM
 Peng, Zhaoqin (1968) People's Republic of China, Netherlands – GM 2004
 Pertlová, Soňa (1988–2011) Czech Republic – WIM
 Piatigorsky, Jacqueline (1911–2012) France, USA
 Pogonina, Natalia (1985) Russia – WGM and IM
 Pokorná, Regina (1982) Austria – WGM
 Polgár, Judit (1976) Hungary – GM 1991
 Polgár, Sófia (1974) Hungary, Israel – WGM and IM
 Polgar, Susan (1969) Hungary, USA – Women's World champion, GM 1991
 Polihroniade, Elisabeta (1935–2016) Romania – WGM
 Pourkashiyan, Atousa (1988) Iran – WGM
 Price, Edith Charlotte (1872–1956) England
 Ptáčníková, Lenka (1976) Czech Republic, Iceland – WGM
 Pujari, Rucha (1994) India – WIM

Q
 Qin Kanying (1974) People's Republic of China – WGM
 Qiyu Zhou (2000)  Canada – WGM

R
 Radeva, Viktoria (2001) Bulgaria – WGM
 Rajlich, Iweta (1981) Poland – WGM and IM
 Ranasinghe, Sachini (1994) Sri Lanka – WIM
 Ratcu, Tatiana (1979) Brazil – WIM
 Regan, Natasha (1971) England – WIM
 Reischer, Salome (1899–1980) Austria – WIM
 Reizniece-Ozola, Dana (1981) Latvia – WGM
 Richards, Heather (1983) England, Australia – WIM
 Riegler, Alessandra (1961) Italy – ICCF Women's World Champion
 Rinder, Friedl (1905–2001) Germany – WIM
 Rogule, Laura (1988) Latvia – WGM
 Roodzant, Catharina (1896–1999) The Netherlands
 Roos, Nancy (1905–1957) United States
 Rootare, Salme (1913–1987) Estonia – WIM
 Ross, Laura (1988) United States – WFM
 Ruan Lufei (1987) China – WGM
 Rubene, Ilze (1958–2002) – WIM
 Rubtsova, Olga (1909–1992) Russia – Women's World Champion and IFCC Women's World Champion, WGM
 Rudenko, Lyudmila (1904–1986) Ukraine, Russia – Women's World Champion, WGM and IM, first woman awarded the International Master title
 Rudge, Mary (1842–1919) England
 Rudolf, Anna (1987) Hungary – WGM and IM

S
 Sabure, Taduetso (1982) Botswana – WGM
 Sachdev, Tania (1986) India – IM and WGM
 Šafranska, Anda (1960) Latvia, France – WGM
 Salimova, Nurgyul (2003) Bulgaria – WGM and IM
 Sargsyan, Anna M. (2001) (Armenia) – IM
 Schwartzmann, Paulette (1910–19??) Latvia, France, Argentina
 Schneider, Jana (2002) Germany – FM
 Schneider, Veronika (1987) Hungary – WGM
 Schut, Lisa (1994) Netherlands – IM
 Sebag, Marie (1986) France – GM 2008
 Selkirk, Rebecca (1993) South Africa – WCM
 Semenova, Lidia (1951) Ukraine – WGM
 Shahade, Jennifer (1980) USA – WGM
 Sheldon, Ruth (1980) England – WIM
 Shen Yang  (1989) China – IM
 Shuvalova, Polina (2001) Russia – IM and WGM
 Sieber, Fiona (2000) Germany – WIM 
 Skripchenko, Almira (1976) Moldova, France –  WGM and IM
 Soćko, Monika (1978) Poland – GM 2008
 Solomons, Anzel (1978) South Africa – WIM
 Srebrnič, Ana (1984) Slovenia – WGM
 Starr, Nava (1949) Latvia, Canada – WIM
 Stefanova, Antoaneta (1979) Bulgaria – Women's World Champion, GM 2003
 Stevenson, Agnes (1873–1935) England
 Stock, Lara (1992) Germany, Croatia WGM
 Styazhkina, Anna (1997) Russia – WIM
 Sukhareva, Olga (1984) Russia – ICCF Women's World Champion
 Sultana Shirin, Sharmin (1989) Bangladesh – WIM
 Sun Fanghui (1993) China – WIM

T
 Tairova, Elena (1991–2010) Russia – WGM and IM
 Tan Zhongyi (1991) China – GM
 Tian Tian (1983) China – WGM
 Toma, Katarzyna (1985) Poland, England – WGM
 Tonini, Alice Italy
 Topel, Zehra (1987) Turkey – WIM
 Tranmer, Eileen (1910–1983) England – WIM
 Tuvshintugs, Batchimeg (1986) Mongolia – WGM
 Tsatsalashvili, Keti (1992) Georgia – WGM

U
 Ushenina, Anna (1985) Ukraine – GM 2012

V
 Vaishali Rameshbabu (2001) India – IM
 Vajda, Szidonia (1979) Romania, Hungary – WGM and IM
 van der Merwe, Cecile (1987) South Africa – WIM
 Varela La Madrid, Tilsia Carolina (1994) Venezuela – WIM
 Vargas, Gabriela (1988) Paraguay – WIM
 Verőci, Zsuzsa (1949) Hungary – WGM
 Volpert, Larissa (1926–2017) Russia – WGM
 Vozovic, Oksana (1985) Ukraine – WGM

W
 Shahenda Wafa (1998) Egypt – WGM
 Shrook Wafa (1997) Egypt – WGM
 Annie Wang (2002) United States – IM
 Wang Jue (1995) China – WGM
 Wang Lei (1975) China – WGM
 Wang Pin (1974) China – WGM
 Wang Yu (1982) China – IM
 Wijesuriya, Suneetha Sri Lanka
 Wijesuriya, Vineetha (1970) Sri Lanka – WCM
 Wolf-Kalmar, Paula (1881–1931) Austria
 Wu Mingqian (1961) China – WGM

X
 Xie Jun (1970) People's Republic of China – Women's World champion, GM 1994
 Xu Yuanyuan (1981) China – WGM
 Xu Yuhua (1976) People's Republic of China – Women's World champion, GM 2007

Y
 Yakovleva, Lora (1932) Russia – ICCF Women's World Champion
 Yakubboeva, Nilufar (2000) Uzbekistan – WIM
 Yıldız, Betül Cemre (1989) Turkey – WGM
 Yuanling Yuan (1994) China – WIM

Z
 Zatonskih, Anna (1978) Ukraine, USA – WGM and IM
 Zatulovskaya, Tatiana (1935) Azerbaijan, Russia, Israel – WGM
 Zawadzka, Beata (1986) Poland – WGM
 Zhai Mo (1966) China – WGM
 Zhang Xiaowen (1989) China – WGM
 Zhao Lan (1963) China – WIM
 Zhao Xue (1985) People's Republic of China – GM 2008
 Zhu Chen (1976) People's Republic of China, Qatar – Women's World champion, GM 2001
 Zhu Jin'er (2002) China – WIM
 Zhukova, Natalia (1979) Ukraine – GM 2010
 Zvorykina, Kira (1919–2014) Ukraine, Belarus, Bulgaria – WGM

See also

 :Category:Chess woman grandmasters
 Women's World Chess Championship

References

External links
 Women's top ratings on FIDE.com

Lists of chess players
Chess
Women's chess